In chemistry, a vanadate is an anionic coordination complex of vanadium. Often vanadate refers to oxoanions of vanadium, most of which exist in its highest oxidation state of +5.

Conventionally this ion is represented with a single double bond, however this is a resonance form as the ion is a regular tetrahedron with four equivalent oxygen atoms.

Additionally a range of polyoxovanadate ions exist which include discrete ions and "infinite" polymeric ions.

In chemical nomenclature when vanadate forms part of the name, it indicates that the compound contains an anion with a central vanadium atom, e.g. ammonium hexafluorovanadate is a common name for the compound  with the IUPAC name of ammonium hexafluoridovanadate(III).

Examples of oxovanadate ions
Some examples of discrete ions are
 "orthovanadate", tetrahedral.
 "pyrovanadate", corner-shared  tetrahedra, similar to the dichromate ion
, cyclic with corner-shared  tetrahedra
, cyclic with corner-shared  tetrahedra
, corner shared  tetrahedra
, ring.
 "decavanadate", edge- and corner-shared  octahedra

, fused  octahedra 

Some examples of polymeric "infinite" ions are
 in e.g. , sodium metavanadate
 in 

In these ions vanadium exhibits tetrahedral, square pyramidal and octahedral coordination. In this respect vanadium shows similarities to tungstate and molybdate, whereas chromium however has a more limited range of ions.

Aqueous solutions
Dissolution of vanadium pentoxide in strongly basic aqueous solution gives the colourless  ion. On acidification, this solution's colour gradually darkens through orange to red at around pH 7. Brown hydrated V2O5 precipitates around pH 2, redissolving to form a light yellow solution containing the  ion. The number and identity of the oxyanions that exist between pH 13 and 2 depend on pH as well as concentration. For example, protonation of vanadate initiates a series of condensations to produce polyoxovanadate ions:

pH 9–12: , 
pH 2–4: ,

Pharmacological properties
Vanadate is a potent inhibitor of certain plasma membrane ATPases, such as Na+/K+-ATPase and Ca2+-ATPase (PMCA). Acting as a transition-state analog of phosphate, vanadate undergoes nucleophillic attack by water during phosphoryl transfer, essentially "trapping" P-type ATPases in their phosphorylated E2 state.
 However, it does not inhibit other ATPases, such as SERCA (sarco/endoplasmic reticulum Ca2+-ATPase), actomyosin ATPase and mitochondrial ATPase.

References

 
Transition metal oxyanions
Oxometallates